New York's 63rd State Senate district is one of 63 districts in the New York State Senate. It has been represented by Democrat Timothy M. Kennedy, under different district numbers and lines, since his 2010 primary defeat of incumbent William Stachowski.

Prior to 2012, the State Senate had only 62 districts, meaning that the 63rd district did not exist until then. However, the new district followed similar lines as the old Buffalo-based 58th district, and it was in fact the 46th district that was entirely new.

Geography
District 63 covers parts of Erie County in Western New York, including most of Buffalo and all of Cheektowaga and Lackawanna.

The district is located entirely within New York's 26th congressional district, and overlaps with the 141st, 142nd, 143rd, and 149th districts of the New York State Assembly.

Recent election results

2020

2018

2016

2014

2012

Federal results in District 63

References

63